Cycle Glacier is a glacier,  long and  wide, flowing north from the polar plateau between Mount Dearborn and Robinson Peak into Mackay Glacier, Victoria Land. Approved by the New Zealand Geographic Board in 1995, the name alludes to the use of a bicycle as a practical means of transportation by a New Zealand glacial mapping party led by Trevor Chinn, summer season 1992–93, and is part of a theme of cycling names in the area.

References
 

Glaciers of Scott Coast